In Greek mythology, Python (gen. Πύθωνος) was the serpent, sometimes represented as a medieval-style dragon, living at the center of the earth, believed by the ancient Greeks to be at Delphi.

Mythology
Python, sometimes written Pytho, presided at the Delphic oracle, which existed in the cult center for its mother, Gaia, "Earth", Pytho being the place name that was substituted for the earlier Krisa. Greeks considered the site to be the center of the earth, represented by a stone, the omphalos or navel,  which Python guarded.

Python became the chthonic enemy of the later Olympian deity Apollo, who slew it and took over Python's former home and oracle. These were the most famous and revered in the ancient Greek and Roman worlds. Like many monsters, Python was known as Gaia's son and prophesied as Gaia's son. 
Therefore, Apollo had to eliminate this opponent before establishing his temple in Delphi.

Versions and interpretations

There are various versions of Python's birth and death at the hands of Apollo. In the Homeric Hymn to Apollo, now thought to have been composed in 522 BCE when the archaic period in Greek history was giving way to the Classical period,  a small detail is provided regarding Apollo's combat with the serpent, in some sections identified as the deadly drakaina, or her parent.

The version related by Hyginus holds that when Zeus lay with the goddess Leto, and she became pregnant with Artemis and Apollo, Hera was jealous and sent Python to pursue Leto throughout the lands, to prevent her from giving birth to the twin gods. Thus, when Apollo was grown he wanted to avenge his mother's plight and pursued Python, making his way straight for Mount Parnassus where the serpent dwelled and chased it to the oracle of Gaia at Delphi; there he dared to penetrate the sacred precinct and kill it with his arrows beside the rock cleft where the priestess sat on her tripod. Robert Graves, who habitually read into primitive myths a retelling of archaic political and social turmoil, saw in this the capture by Hellenes of a pre-Hellenic shrine. "To placate local opinion at Delphi," he wrote in The Greek Myths, "regular funeral games were instituted in honor of the dead hero Python, and her priestess was retained in office."

According to an epigram from 159 BC, it seems that Python in particular meant to rape Leto. Clearchus of Soli wrote that while Python was pursuing them, Leto stepped on a stone and, holding Apollo in her hands, cried  (híe paî, meaning "shoot, child") to him, who was holding a bow and arrows. 

The politics are conjectural, but the myth reports that Zeus ordered Apollo to purify himself for the sacrilege and instituted the Pythian Games, over which Apollo was to preside, as penance for his act.

Erwin Rohde wrote that the Python was an earth spirit, who was conquered by Apollo, and buried under the omphalos and that it is a case of one god setting up his temple on the grave of another.

The priestess of the oracle at Delphi became known as the Pythia, after the place-name Pytho, which Greeks explained as named after the rotting (πύθειν) of the slain serpent's corpse in the strength of Hyperion (day) or Helios (the sun).

Karl Kerenyi notes that the older tales mentioned two dragons who were perhaps intentionally conflated. A female dragon named Delphyne (cf. Python was the good daemon (ἀγαθὸς δαίμων) of the temple as it appears in Minoan religion, but she was represented as a dragon, as often happens in Northern European folklore as well as in the East.

This myth has been described as an allegory for the dispersal of the fogs and clouds of vapor that arise from ponds and marshes (Python) by the rays of the sun (the arrows of Apollo).

See also
  Python, a genus of the family Pythonidae, which the genus was named after

 Apollo Belvedere
 Dragons in Greek mythology
 Pythia
 Serpent (symbolism)
 Saint George and the Dragon
 Metaphor of the sun
 Yamata no Orochi

Notes

References

 Burkert, Walter, Greek Religion 1985.
 Deane, John Bathurst, The Worship of the Serpent, 1833. Cf. Chapter V., p. 329.  
 Farnell, Lewis Richard, The Cults of the Greek States, 1896.
 Fontenrose, Joseph Eddy, Python; a study of Delphic myth and its origins, 1959.
 Goodrich, Norma Lorre, Priestesses, 1990.
 Guthrie, William Keith Chambers, The Greeks and their Gods, 1955.
 Hall, Manly Palmer, The Secret Teachings of All Ages, 1928. Ch. 14 cf. Greek Oracles,www, PRS
 Harrison, Jane Ellen, Themis: A Study of the Social Origins of Greek Religion, 1912. cf. Chapter IX, p. 329 especially, on the slaying of the Python.
 Kerenyi, Karl, (1951) 1980. The Gods of the Greeks especially pp 135–6.  
 Homeric Hymn to Pythian Apollo
 
 
 Rohde, Erwin, Psyche, 1925.
 Smith, William; Dictionary of Greek and Roman Biography and Mythology, London (1873). "Python" 

Greek dragons
World-bearing animals
 Children of Gaia
Deeds of Apollo
Ancient Delphi
Legendary serpents
Deeds of Hera
Leto
Chthonic beings